{{Infobox person
| name               = Abir Chatterjee  
| image              = Abir Chatterjee 2018.jpg
| imagesize          = 
| caption            = Chatterjee in 2018
| birth_date         = 
| birth_place        = 
| nationality        = Indian
| occupation         = 
| spouse             = 
| death_date         = 
| years_active       = 2009–present
| works              = {{unbulleted list|Durgeshgorer Guptodhon|Asur|Bishorjan|Shah Jahan Regency|Har Har Byomkesh|Abby Sen|Jomer Raja Dilo Bor|Bojhena Shey Bojhena|Byomkesh Phire Elo|Byomkesh Bakshi|The Royal Bengal Tiger}}
| children           = Mayurakshi Chatterjee
| alma_mater         = Goenka College of Commerce and Business AdministrationInstitute of Chartered Financial Analysts of India
}}

Abir Chatterjee (born 18 November 1980) is an Indian actor who mainly works in Bengali cinema. He is the son of theater personalities Phalguni Chatterjee and Rumki Chatterjee. He started his career with Bengali television and made his debut in Bengali cinema in 2009 as a lead with Cross Connection. He is well known for appearing as famous Detective  Byomkesh Bakshi in separate movie series.He has starred in 33 consecutive box-office successes between 2010 and 2022.

 Early life and education 
He is the son of theatre artists Phalguni Chatterjee and Rumki Chatterjee. He was granted his B.Com degree from the Goenka College of Commerce and Business Administration and his MBA degree from the ICFAI Business School, Kolkata.

 Personal life 
Chatterjee is married to Nandini Chatterjee, his college friend in 2007. The couple has a daughter named Mayurakshi Chatterjee. He is an avid East Bengal fan.

 Career 
He has acted in many Bengali serials including  Proloy..asche  Ruposhi Bangla, Shasuri Zindabad, Khuje Berai Kacher Manush, Banhishikha, Sudhu Tomari Jonno, Somoy, Ek Akasher Niche, and Janmobhumi.

He has appeared in Bengali movies as Byomkesh Bakshi and Feluda. The Indian Express said he brought "elegant élan and confidence" to his role in The Royal Bengal Tiger.

Abir has appeared as Byomkesh Bakshi in two different series, one helmed by Anjan Dutt and the other by Arindam Sil. He appeared as Feluda in the 2014 film Badshahi Angti.

Abir Chatterjee's great lost film is his screen debut in the 2004 independent period drama Robibar Bikelbela, in which he portrays a disillusioned former Naxalite revolutionary in post-Emergency Bengal. No copies of the film have been found yet.

2014 saw his emergence in a solo leading role in the critically acclaimed film Hrid Majharey by debutant director Ranjan Ghosh.
After acting in this film, he went on to top the list of Calcutta Times Most Desirable Men of 2014 and 2019. Since 2020, he hosts Zee Bangla Sa Re Ga Ma Pa.

In 2018 Abir worked in Flat No 609 as a lead role. In 2022, he debuted in the Hindi industry with Season 2 of the SonyLIV original Avrodh.

 Filmography 

 Awards 

2016 – International Bangla Film Awards (NABC) – Best Actor (Popular Choice) for Bastushaap2017 – International Bangla Film Awards (NABC) – Best Actor (Critics's Choice) for Byomkesh Pawrbo2017 – Star Jalsha Parivaar Awards – Best Jodi (with Sohini Sarkar) for Byomkesh Pawrbo2018 – Star Jalsha Parivaar Awards – Best Actor for Shob Bhooturey2018 – Borsho Sera Chalachitra Samman by Information & Cultural Affairs Department, West Bengal

2019 – ABP Ananda Sera Bangali for Outstanding contribution to cinema

2019 – Zee 24 Ghanta Ananya Samman for Contributions to cinema in West Bengal

2019 – Kalakar Awards – Best Actor for Byomkesh Gowtro2019 – Tele Cine Awards – Best Jodi (with Jaya Ahsan) for Bijoya2020 – WBJFA – Most Popular Actor for Byomkesh Gowtro'' (Joint Winner)

2020 – West Bengal Film Journalists' Association Awards for Best Actor In A Negative Role – Abir Chatterjee for asur

See also 
 List of Indian film actors

References

External links 

 Abir Chatterjee on Facebook
 

Bengali male television actors
Living people
Male actors in Bengali cinema
Indian male film actors
1980 births
Goenka College of Commerce and Business Administration alumni
University of Calcutta alumni